Bariyatu Block is one of the administrative community development block of Latehar district, Jharkhand state, India.

References
https://web.archive.org/web/20090425150722/http://latehar.nic.in/overview.htm

Latehar district
Community development blocks in Jharkhand
Community development blocks in Latehar district
Cities and towns in Latehar district